Alfred Berry (31 December 1883–1945) was an English footballer who played in the Football League for Bury.

References

1883 births
1945 deaths
English footballers
Association football forwards
English Football League players
Oldham Athletic A.F.C. players
Bury F.C. players
Rossendale United F.C. players
Haslingden F.C. players